The enzyme 3′-nucleotidase (EC 3.1.3.6) the reaction

a 3′-ribonucleotide + H2O  a ribonucleoside + phosphate

This enzyme belongs to the family of hydrolases, specifically those acting on phosphoric monoester bonds.  The systematic name is 3′-ribonucleotide phosphohydrolase. Other names in common use include 3′-mononucleotidase, 3′-phosphatase, and 3′-ribonucleotidase.  This enzyme participates in purine and pyrimidine metabolism.

References

 

EC 3.1.3
Enzymes of unknown structure